Death by Fire is the third album by Swedish heavy metal band Enforcer. It was released on February 1, 2013, through Nuclear Blast.

Track listing

Personnel 
 Olof Wikstrandvocals, rhythm guitar, lead guitar
 Joseph Tholllead guitar
 Jonas Wikstranddrums
 Tobias Lindqvistbass

References

2013 albums
Enforcer (band) albums
Nuclear Blast albums